Naresh Manbodhe (born 15 July 1972) is a Guyanese cricketer. He played in three first-class matches for Guyana in 1994/95 and 1995/96.

See also
 List of Guyanese representative cricketers

References

External links
 

1972 births
Living people
Guyanese cricketers
Guyana cricketers